Jake T. Mooty (April 13, 1912 – April 20, 1970) was an American Major League Baseball pitcher with the Cincinnati Reds, Chicago Cubs and the Detroit Tigers between 1936 and 1944. He batted and threw right-handed. Mooty attended Texas A&M University from 1933 to 1935.

Notes

References

External links

Major League Baseball pitchers
Cincinnati Reds players
Chicago Cubs players
Detroit Tigers players
Wilmington Pirates players
Toronto Maple Leafs (International League) players
Syracuse Chiefs players
Nashville Vols players
Los Angeles Angels (minor league) players
Portland Beavers players
San Diego Padres (minor league) players
El Paso Texans players
Baseball players from Texas
Texas A&M Aggies baseball players
1912 births
1970 deaths